Lucien Deslinières (1857 in Vierzon – 1937 in Vernouillet) was a French journalist, writer and socialist.

Deslinières joined the Parti Ouvrier Français (POF) in 1891. He later tried unsuccessfully to establish a collectivist settlement in Mexico. After the Russian Revolution, he travelled to the USSR, becoming an agricultural commissar in the Ukraine in 1920. Civil war and shortage of money blocking his schemes of agrarian reform, he returned to France.

Works
 L'application du système collectiviste, 1899
 Projet de code socialiste, 1908
 Le Maroc socialiste, 1912
 Comment se réalisera le socialisme, 1919. Translated by Eden and Cedar Paul as The coming of socialism
 La France nord-africaine; étude critique de la colonisation anarchique pratiquée jusqu'à ce jour. Projet de colonisation organisée, 1920
 Délivrons-nous du Marxisme, 1923
 La production intensive, 1923
 Principes d'économie socialiste, 1924
 Dans l'ornière marxiste, en France, en Russie : pour en sortir, 1927

References

Further reading
 Guy Thuillier, 'Lucien Deslinières et le socialisme bureaucratique', Bureaucratie et bureaucrates en France au XIXe siècle, 1980, p. 154ff.

1857 births
1937 deaths
French journalists
French socialists
French male non-fiction writers